The 8th Vanier Cup was played on November 25, 1972, at Varsity Stadium in Toronto, Ontario, and decided the CIAU football champion for the 1972 season. The Alberta Golden Bears won their second championship by defeating the Waterloo Lutheran Golden Hawks by a score of 20-7.

References

External links
 Official website

Vanier Cup
Vanier Cup
1972 in Toronto
November 1972 sports events in Canada
Canadian football competitions in Toronto